O. A. K. Sundar (born 3 January 1970) is an Indian actor who mainly works in Tamil cinema and television. He is known for his antagonistic roles starting with  Virumaandi. He played the main character in the television series, Romapuri Pandian and the role of Bhisma in Mahabharatam. He is the son of Indian actor O. A. K. Thevar, who also appeared in negative roles in several films.

Career 
O. A. K. Sundar made his film debut with Nadodi Pattukkaran (1992). He played supporting roles in several films including Virumaandi (2004) and Naan Avanillai (2007). Regarding his performance in Nellu (2010), a critic noted that "Veteran actor OAK Sunder gets a full fledged role and plays it to the hilt".
He garnered acclaim for his portrayal of Bheeshma in the television serial Mahabharatam. After working on several television series, he stopped working on them to concentrate on films. He has since portrayed negative characters in several films including Kidaari (2016), Saamy Square (2018), and Rocky: The Revenge (2019).

Personal life 
He is the son of actor O. A. K. Thevar, who acted as a villain in several films. In 2006, he married Loganayaki. The couple have one son Aadhishankar.

While shooting for Vaadaa (2010) in Rishikesh, he was caught by the Indian Army since he looked like Osama Bin Laden in his getup.

Filmography

Television

Films 
All films are in Tamil, unless otherwise noted.

References

External links
 

Male actors in Tamil cinema
Living people
Indian male film actors
Male actors from Madurai
1975 births